Kimsa Tinkuy (Quechua kimsa three, to meet, meeting, (also related to the confluence of rivers) "three meetings", also spelled Quimsa Tincuy, Quimsa Ticuy) is a mountain in the Bolivian Andes which reaches a height of approximately . It is located in the Cochabamba Department, Quillacollo Province, Quillacollo Municipality. Kimsa Tinkuy lies northwest to west of Awila Wachana Punta and southeast of Quna Quna Q'asa.

References 

Mountains of Cochabamba Department